Will Jones was an African-American man who was lynched in Ellaville, Schley County, Georgia by a white mob on February 13, 1922. According to the United States Senate Committee on the Judiciary it was the 13th of 61 lynchings during 1922 in the United States.

Background

28-year-old Will Jones lived on a farm occupied by the landowner widow Mrs. Dora Fulford, mother-in-law of Bennie DeVane one of the accused and was regarded as an upstanding citizen by the community. News coverage at the time gave no official reason for the lynching but implied it might have been either Jones was going to report on the bootlegging that was going on in the area or that Will Jones came to the defence of 26-year-old African-American man Floyd Flournoy who had insulted Jessie Mae Devane, by asking for a ride in her buggy.

Lynching

Will Jones was shot at his home, near the Lowe settlement, between 10 and 11:00 PM Sunday, February 12, 1922. Before dying the next day, he was able to make a dying statement to County Commissioner Williamson and Mayor Rogers Williams that identified some of those who shot him. He said that on Sunday he was awakened by someone at his door asking for an auto-tire patch. When Jones refused to open the door, several men started to break in. He grabbed his shotgun and fled out of the back. It was here that he was shot at and where he was able to get off a few shots, wounding Bennie and Harvey. He then fled into the night and sought the help of others. Others had heard the gunshots and were too afraid to help Jones. He then fled to Ellaville. Here, a white mob has assembled and tracked him down to a small shack on the Hart farm, which is located near the line of Sumter and Schley counties around 9:00 AM. A gun battle ensued and the mob left, believing Jones dead.

Aftermath

Nine men were accused of taking part in the Lynching and warrants for arrest were issued by the coroner. Clarence Robinson, Thomas Brown, George Trussie Phillips, Henry Lewis Fulford, Henry Harvery (Jessie Mae Devane’s father), Arthur DeVane, Bennie DeVane, and John DeVane. Schley County Sheriff R.E. Battle was accused of helping some of the accused escape the law.  Seven of the nine were local farmers and two were soldiers, on leave from Camp Benning, who were camping in the area who, according to the Atlanta Constitution, “joined the mob through a spirit of excitement and adventure [rather] than because of any interest they held in the lynching of the negro.”

National memorial 

Featured among other things is the Memorial Corridor which displays 805 hanging steel rectangles, each representing the counties in the United States where a documented lynching took place and, for each county, the names of those lynched. The memorial hopes that communities, like Schley County, Georgia where Jones was lynched, will take these slabs and install them in their own communities.

Bibliography 
Notes

References

1922 riots
1922 in Georgia (U.S. state)
Deaths by person in Georgia (U.S. state)
December 1922 events
Lynching deaths in Georgia (U.S. state)
Protest-related deaths
Racially motivated violence against African Americans
Riots and civil disorder in Georgia (U.S. state)
White American riots in the United States